Warren Township is one of twenty-three townships in Jo Daviess County, Illinois, USA.  As of the 2010 census, its population was 1,601 and it contained 770 housing units.  Its name changed from Courtland Township in 1865.

Geography

Cities, towns, villages
 Village of Warren.

Cemeteries
The township contains these two cemeteries: Elmwood and Saint Annes Catholic.

Major highways
  Illinois Route 78.

Demographics

School districts
 Warren Community Unit School District 205.

Political districts
 Illinois' 16th congressional district.
 State House District 89.
 State Senate District 45.

References
 
 United States Census Bureau 2007 TIGER/Line Shapefiles.
 United States National Atlas.

External links
 Jo Daviess County official site.
 City-Data.com.
 Illinois State Archives.
 Township Officials of Illinois.

Townships in Jo Daviess County, Illinois
Townships in Illinois